Willie Isa (born 1 January 1989) is a Samoa international rugby league footballer who plays as a  for the Wigan Warriors in the Betfred Super League.

Background
Isa was born in Auckland, New Zealand, and moved to Sydney, New South Wales, Australia as a 1-year-old. Isa was educated at St Dominic's College, Penrith.

He played his junior rugby league for the St Mary's Saints before being signed by the Penrith Panthers.

Career
Isa previously played one NRL match for the Penrith Panthers, called up unexpectedly at half-time in a NYC game to replace an injured player.
Isa was signed by Melbourne for the 2009 NRL season and he was compared to the Storm's former star player, Israel Folau.
He was selected in the Samoan squad in 2010.
On 16 December 2010, it was announced that Isa had signed for Castleford on a 12-month contract, Castleford coach Terry Matterson referred to this signing as being similar to that of Rangi Chase

Isa signed for Widnes for the 2012 Season. In 2012, Widnes fan, David Quayle created a Facebook page on Isa, stating that if Isa was to score; the Widnes fans would riot. Despite popularity on Facebook, no fans rioted when Isa scored his first (and second) Widnes try against Hull F.C. in a 42–16 win.
In 2013, Isa found a new position, that position of second row transformed him into one of the form players of the super league. On 16 May 2014, Isa was the 9th player in as many weeks to sign a new contract and stay with the Vikings. He signed a new two-year deal.
On 29 September 2015, it was announced that Isa had signed a two-year contract with an option for a 3rd year with Wigan starting in 2016.

Isa played in the 2016 Super League Grand Final victory over the Warrington Wolves at Old Trafford.
Isa played in the 2017 Challenge Cup Final defeat by Hull F.C. at Wembley Stadium.
Isa played in the 2020 Super League Grand Final which Wigan lost 8-4 against St Helens.
In round 20 of the 2021 Super League season, Isa was sent to the sin bin and placed on report for another incident in Wigan's 26-2 loss against St Helens.
Isa played 22 games for Wigan in the 2022 Super League season. Isa did not feature in the clubs 2022 Challenge Cup Final victory over Huddersfield.

References

External links
Wigan Warriors profile
Castleford Tigers profile
SL profile

1989 births
Living people
Castleford Tigers players
Expatriate rugby league players in Australia
Melbourne Storm players
New Zealand expatriate rugby league players
New Zealand expatriate sportspeople in Australia
New Zealand expatriate sportspeople in England
New Zealand sportspeople of Samoan descent
New Zealand rugby league players
Penrith Panthers players
Rugby league centres
Rugby league players from Auckland
Rugby league wingers
Samoa national rugby league team players
Samoan rugby league players
Widnes Vikings players
Wigan Warriors players